Al-Sahwah (also spelled el-Sahoa or Sahweh); also known as Sahwat al-Qamh or Sehwet el-Kamh is a village in southern Syria, administratively part of the Daraa Governorate, located east of Daraa. Nearby localities include al-Jiza to the southwest, Ghasm to the south, Maaraba, Daraa to the southeast, Umm Walad to the northeast, al-Musayfirah to the north and Kahil to the west. According to the Syria Central Bureau of Statistics, al-Sahwah had a population of 3,950 in the 2004 census, making it the least populous locality in the al-Musayfirah nahiyah ("subdistrict").

History
In 1596 Al-Sahwah appeared in the Ottoman  tax registers under the name of Sahut al-Qamh, as  being part of the nahiya of Butayna in the Qada Hauran. It had an entirely  Muslim  population consisting of 9 households and 4 bachelors. They paid a fixed tax-rate of 40% on agricultural products, including   wheat, barley, summer crops, goats and/or beehives; a total of 3,300 akçe.

There are ruins of an ancient tower and a church in al-Sahwah. Although the buildings are of some significance, they do not differ much from the ancient Roman and Byzantine architecture found throughout the Hauran. The village did not have any Christian residents in the 19th century.

In 1838 the village was classified as a khirba ("abandoned village") by English biblical scholar Eli Smith. In the late 19th-century al-Sahwah had a population of about 350 people living in about 70 households. The village was vulnerable to incursions by Druze raiders, and also had a shortage of water sources. If, in the event of a bad harvest, they could not pay this sum, the village would face mass hunger and cattle had to be taken to Bosra for water.

References

Bibliography

External links 
 Map of the town, Google Maps
 Bosra-map; 22M

Populated places in Daraa District